The 1985 ABN World Tennis Tournament was a men's tennis tournament played on indoor carpet courts at Rotterdam Ahoy in the Netherlands. It was part of the 1985 Nabisco Grand Prix. The tournament was held from 18 March through 24 March 1985. Unseeded Miloslav Mečíř won the singles title.

Prize money

*per team

Finals

Singles

 Miloslav Mečíř defeated  Jakob Hlasek 6–1, 6–2
 It was Mečíř's first singles title of his career.

Doubles
 Pavel Složil /  Tomáš Šmíd defeated  Vitas Gerulaitis /  Paul McNamee 6–4, 6–4

References

External links
 Official website 
 Official website 
 ATP tournament profile
 ITF tournament details

 
ABN World Tennis Tournament
ABN World Tennis Tournament
ABN World Tennis Tournament